Zenkeria is a genus of South Asian plants in the grass family.

 Species
 Zenkeria elegans Trin. - Tamil Nadu; naturalized in Sri Lanka
 Zenkeria jainii N.C.Nair, Sreek. & V.J.Nair - India
 Zenkeria obtusiflora (Thwaites) Benth. - Sri Lanka
 Zenkeria sebastinei A.N.Henry & Chandrab. - Kerala
 Zenkeria stapfii Henrard  - Tamil Nadu, Sri Lanka

References

External links
 Grassbase - The World Online Grass Flora

Molinieae
Bunchgrasses of Asia
Grasses of India
Flora of Sri Lanka
Poaceae genera